Al Dhafra Futsal Club is an Emirati futsal club from Madinat Zayed and part of AL DHAFRA SC family.
Club participated in AFC Futsal Club Championship.

History 
Al Dhafra FC was established  as part of a policy to promote sports across the country and the Al Dhafra region of Abu Dhabi had no team, so Al Dhafra is the first and only club to be located in the western region.

Managers

 Luis Fonseca
 Rui Guimaraes
 Dejan Dedovic (2020–present)

Honours
UAE President's Cup: 
Winner (1): 2014/2015
 UAE futsal league: 
Champions: 2016-17, 2017–18 , 2020-21
 UAE futsal Cup: 2
Champions: 2016/17, 2017/18
UAE Federation Cup: 
Vice Champion: 2021
UAE Super Cup:
Winner: 2021

References
Players list AFC futsal club championship 2018
Players list AFC futsal club championship 2019
Al Dhafra - Kazma 
Al Dhafra - Mess SungunAl Dhafra dedicates the achievement of the League to Hamdan bin Zayed

External links
 Official site

Dhafra
Sport in the Emirate of Abu Dhabi